Cherry Turner (also spelled "Chary") was an enslaved American Indian in Southampton, Virginia in the early 1800s. She was the wife of slave activist, Nat Turner.

Early life 
In the year 1831, Cherry was believed to be about 10 years old. She was younger than Nat. Cherry lived at Turner's plantation from about 1821 to 1823.

Marriage and children 
It is largely speculated that Nat and Cherry met and were married at Samuel Turner's plantation in the early 1820s, although historians still dispute who exactly Nat Turner's wife was. Furthering the issue, claims about Nat Turner are difficult to verify.

It is widely believed that Cherry did have children, but it is undetermined how many. Historians vary anywhere between believing she had 1 to 3 children. The most widely held belief is that the pair had 2 or 3 children - 1 daughter and 1 or 2 sons. Historians believe one of their children was a slave boy named Riddick.

Giles Reese Plantation 
After Samuel Turner died in 1823, Cherry and Nat were separated. Nat was sold to Thomas Moore.  while Cherry and her children were sold to Giles Reese.

Nat Turner's Rebellion 
During Nat Turner's rebellion, the rebels avoided Giles Reese plantation, even though it was in route, likely because Nat wanted to keep Cherry and the children safe. Regardless, while authorities were in search of Nat, they went looking for Cherry as well. On September 26, 1831, the Richmond Constitutional Whig published a story after the raiding of Reese' plantation stating that, "in [his] possession, some papers given up by his wife, under the lash." The Authentic and Impartial Narrative also publish that same year saying that journal entries belonging to Nat were "in her possession after Nat's escape."

In his book Nat Turner: Slave Revolt Leader  author Terry Bisson writes "[Nat] trusted [Cherry] with his most secret plans and papers. After his slave rebellion, she was beaten and tortured in an attempt to get her to reveal his plans and whereabouts."

In a report by James Trezvant immediately following the uprising, Cherry was mentioned as having admitted to Nat "digesting" a plan for the revolt "for years."

Cherry was not mentioned in Nat Turner's confession to lawyer Thomas Ruffin Gray.

References 

18th-century American slaves
People from Southampton County, Virginia
19th-century American slaves
19th-century Native American women
19th-century Native Americans